Cosplay Mania is an annual cosplay-centered convention organized by Cosplay.PH, and is usually held in the fourth quarter of the year in the Philippines. The convention features various events related to cosplay, anime, Jpop cuture features rookie and veteran cosplayers, costumers and cosplay enthusiasts.  Below are the mainstay activities, some of them unique to the event:

 Solo and Group Cosplay - this activity provides a competitive venue for cosplayers. The competition welcomes cosplayers from Anime / Manga / Games / Comics / Movies / Western Animation genres.  Rules normally vary per year regarding age limitations, genre, or in the case of group cosplay, the number of members involved.

 Meet and Greet - Con-goers are given the opportunity to meet the event's invited International Cosplayer Guests as well as popular artists from Japan and other countries.

 JAM (Japanese Anime Music) Concert - introduced in 2014, it is a concert where invited artists and musically inclined cosplayer guests perform Japanese-inspired songs.

 Cosplay TORCH (Tournament of Champions) - introduced in 2010, it is a national cosplay competition where tournament legs are held in selected major cities in the Philippines.  Usually held in SM Supermalls, it is a pair competition with winners of each leg taking the finals at the Cosplay Mania event.  In the 2011 Tournament, the winning pair will become the official Philippine representatives to join the Anime Festival Asia convention's Regional Cosplay Championship in Singapore.

Cosplay Mania is created and hosted by Cosplay.ph, a Philippine-based cosplay website and organization.

History

2008
The first event was held in Megatrade Hall 3 in SM Megamall, Mandaluyong on October 12, 2008.  Its theme was "Plan... Build... Cosplay!" which revolved around three main activities: Workshops, Costume Building Contest and the Cosplay competition for individual and group. Notable cosplayer Jin Joson and her group the Tux Team were invited to be part of the workshop tutorials as well as judge for the cosplay competition.

2009
With the theme "Bigger and Better", the event incorporated both Megatrade Hall 2 and 3 and opened on September 13, 2009.  Introduced the Cosplay Museum exhibit as well as the Mech Cafe.  This event introduced the inclusion of an onstage LED Video wall backdrop to help enhance the catwalk experience of cosplayers joining Project Cosplay as well as giving those competing in the group cosplay category the option to use digital visual effects to augment their performances.

2010
Cosplay Mania 2010 marked the year where a few major event changes were made.  First was the move to a new location, from SM Megamall in Mandaluyong, to SMX Convention Center beside SM Mall of Asia in Pasay.  The second is having the event as two days instead of just one, October 2 to 3.  The last was the change of their title brand from calendar year 2010 to Roman number X, which became the reoccurring promotional symbol to represent the move to SMX Convention Center as well as the event's theme of "A Decade of Cosplay", where the event celebrated 10 years of cosplaying in the Philippines.

This also introduced the first nationwide cosplay competition called the Cosplay Tournament of Champions (TORCH), where winners of tournament legs from SM Cagayan De Oro, SM Clark, SM Davao, SM Cebu, SM Davao and SM Manila converge for the finals at SMX Convention Center.

The event also invited International Cosplayer guests Clive Lee and Jesuke of Singapore to be part of the celebration and become part of the judges panel for Project Cosplay and TORCH.

Also introduced a cosplay-centric activity called Cosplay Checkmate, a variation of Human Chess where participants in costumes play chess pieces in a life-size chess board, but would act out in character in a choreographed fight scene when the pieces interact.  This version however has no Knight pieces.

2011
The event's theme was "Epic" due to its major changes in its format.  It was still held SMX Convention Center beside SM Mall of Asia in Pasay on October 1 and 2 but has now occupied 3 function rooms, namely Function Room 3, 4 and 5, making the floor area a total of over 5,200 square meters.  The floor plan was changed to a new format, separating into the Stage Area at Function Room 5 where the bands and cosplay activities are held, the Fiesta Hall at Function Room 4 where dealers/sellers are located, and Function Room 3 as an open hall for visitors to socialize.  The Stage and Fiesta hall has entrance fees while the open hall is free for all.

The event held its first ticketing system that involved distribution through SM Ticketing services that made pre-selling of tickets available in all SM Supermalls nationwide.  This was in response to the long lines that plagued its past events when ticket sales were sold on the day itself.

This year's event introduced its first partnership with Anime Festival Asia where the winning pair of Cosplay Mania's Cosplay second Tournament of Champions (TORCH II) will become the official Philippine representatives to join AFA's Regional Cosplay Competition, performing against other cosplay teams from Malaysia, Thailand, Indonesia and Singapore. The Philippine Team, represented by Amado Carl Hernandez (AC) and Zhel, won this year's AFA's Regional Cosplay Competition.

The event also invited International Cosplayer Guests Pinky Lu Xun of Indonesia, YukiGodbless and JiakiDarkness of Thailand, and returning guest Clive Lee of Singapore, all of whom became judges for the event's TORCH, Project Cosplay and Costume Building Contest.

Cosplay Mania also hosted Cosplay Appreciation Day, where cosplayers are invited to register upon entering Function Room 3, in an attempt to set a Guinness World Record of the number of cosplayers attending an event.

Other notable international partnerships that graced the event included Bandai, Gunpla Japan, Crypton Future Media and CosplayGen.

2012
This year's event is still held at SMX Convention Center beside SM Mall of Asia in Pasay, but with the dates moved to September 29 and 30, occupying Function Room 3, 4 and 5.  The floor plan also retained last year's format, separating into the Stage Area at Function Room 5 and the Dealer Area at Function Room 4, both as paying areas.  Function Room 3 is still assigned as a free hall.

The event will again host the finals of the Cosplay Tournament of Champions (TORCH) where the winning pair will represent the Philippines in Anime Festival Asia's (AFA) Regional Cosplay Competition in Singapore.

This year's roster of invited International Cosplayer Guests include renowned Japanese cosplayers KANAME☆ and Reika as well as returning Singaporean guest cosplayer Jesuke.  A Premium Pass was introduced that would give visitors the opportunity to attend Kaname and Reika's Meet and Greet closed-door activities. The limited sales of the passes is separate from the regular convention ticket sales.

Cosplay Mania will again host Cosplay Appreciation Day, where cosplayers are invited to register upon entering Function Room 3, to again attempt to set the Guinness World Record of the number of cosplayers attending an event.

New activities are being introduced in this year's event: 
 SM Cyberzone Cosplay Grand Prix - a partner event of TORCH where only gaming character cosplays are allowed to compete.
 Cosplay Checkers - replacing the Cosplay Chess but retaining the cosplay concept.
 Cosplay Videos Caught on Tape - contest where cosplayers submit their best videos of themselves.
 4Koma Contest - cosplayers submit four-panel comics using their cosplay photographs.  The format is based on a popular type of Manga called a Yonkoma.
 Guest Meet and Greet - an activity where one can meet Kaname or Reika in person through a limited sale of Premium Passes.  The activity includes a handshake, autograph signing and a photo opportunity given to each Premium Pass attendee, as well as freebies.  Each Meet and Greet Guest is assigned a scheduled day, with Reika on September 29 and Kaname on September 30.
 Photobomb Contest - a stage activity where pre-selected groups of con-goers would try to block each other's faces from being shown prominently in the photograph taken from a digital camera setup off-stage.  
 Facepalm-the-Music - two pre-selected contestants try to be the first to guess the title of the music played onstage.  What makes this different from other music-guessing games is that the "buzzer" is a person (an official event volunteer who is fully aware of the nature of the game) where the contestants have to be the first to "tap the buzzer" by palming the volunteer's face as soon as they recognize the music.  The human buzzer then points to the contestant who they believe tapped them first.

Notable supporters of the event include the Department of Foreign Affairs (Philippines), The Embassy of Japan in the Philippines, All Nippon Airways, Toei Animation Philippines and SGCafe.

2013
With the event theme "Overdrive", this year's event is still held at SMX Convention Center beside SM Mall of Asia in Pasay, on October 5 and 6, occupying Function Room 3, 4 and 5.  The floor plan also retained last year's format, separating into the Stage Area at Function Room 5 and the Dealer Area at Function Room 4, both as paying areas.  Function Room 3 is still assigned as a free hall.

The event will again host the finals of the Cosplay Tournament of Champions (TORCH) where the winning pair will represent the Philippines in Anime Festival Asia's (AFA) Regional Cosplay Competition in Singapore.

Cosplay Mania '13 Guests

This year marked the event's most number of guests invited, with 10 guests featuring Jesuke, Vic, Starpolaris Reiko and Viospace from Singapore, Pinky, Orochi and Shinji (Endless ) from Indonesia, and returning Japanese cosplayers guests KANAME☆ and Reika, with a new guest Goldy Marg, a well-known mecha and armor cosplayer from Japan.  All of them were introduced weekly in a series of Guest Reveals presented on Cosplay Mania's Facebook page.

The Meet and Greet Premium Pass were available to KANAME☆, Reika and Goldy with a limited sales of 100 passes per guest is separate from the regular convention ticket sales.

This year introduces the application of Cosplay.ph's CRS, or Cosplay Ranking System, where cosplayers who will join the event's contests are required to apply.  This system would help designate the beginner and veteran ranking as to improve fairness in Cosplay.ph held competitions.

Returning activities are being introduced again this year: 
 SM Cyberzone Cosplay Grand Prix - a partner event of TORCH where only gaming character cosplays are allowed to compete.
 4Koma Contest - cosplayers submit four-panel comics using their cosplay photographs.  The format is based on a popular type of Manga called a Yonkoma.
 Guest Meet and Greet - an activity where one can meet Kaname, Reika and Goldy in person through a limited sale of Premium Passes.  
 Facepalm-the-Music - two pre-selected contestants try to be the first to guess the title of the music played onstage. 
New activities being introduced this year:
 Cosplay Solo Showdown - improving the Project Cosplay Solo contest, the contestants are separated through the Cosplay Division Classification (CDC), designed to address this problem by creating classifications or Classes that can be used to define distinct Cosplay Divisions. There are five Classes that are based on competitor age and costume composition: Junior, Agility, Hybrid, Assault and Titan. This new system addresses the issue of classifying cosplayers' costumes through source material (e.g. cloth cosplay versus armor cosplay), which was often difficult of materials are often equally mixed.  The CDC will be used to organize competitors in respective groups for the purposes of organization, order of appearance on-stage and/or to determine special awards.
 Head to Head LIVE - Cosplay.ph's The Cosplay Show introduced an on-the-spot helmet making contest, which is now being introduced as an event activity.  It is sponsored by High Sierra.
   Early Bird Raffle - attendees who bought their tickets before the event are entitled to a raffle, prizes which includes a BROTHER Printer and Sony PSP's

2014
This year's event marked several new changes which coincide with the theme "Evolution" and held at SMX Convention Center beside SM Mall of Asia in Pasay, on October 4 and 5, occupying Function Room 3, 4 and 5.

Prior to the event, two cosplay events were held which promoted Cosplay Mania '14, dubbed "Road to Cosplay Mania" and the "Cosplay Mania 14 Preview Event".  They were held in SM City Clark, Pampanga and SM Southmall in Las Pinas.

The event will again host the finals of the Cosplay Tournament of Champions (TORCH) where the winning pair will represent the Philippines in Anime Festival Asia's (AFA) Regional Cosplay Competition in Singapore.

New Logo

Cosplay Mania logo is known to incorporate elements that portray the event's varied themes but still retain its usual font and general shape.  This year, a new logo was launched that incorporated sleeker, more modern-looking lines but retained the corporate colors of the event.

New Mascot

Cosplay Mania also introduced their new mascot Cosima Karin that would represent the event's fun-loving ambiance and cosplay-centric atmosphere.  She is accompanied by DotPeach, the official mascot of Cosplay.ph, the company behind the convention and who had long since represented the event.

Cosplay Mania '14 Guests

Ten guests were invited, with returning guests featuring Jesuke Jes and Vic Kumiko from Singapore, Pinky Lu Xun from Indonesia, Orochi X from Australia and Japanese cosplayers guests KANAME☆ and Reika.  New cosplayer guests to arrive are Inui Tatsumi from Japan and Linda Le (Vampy Bit Me) from the US, the event's first guest cosplayer invited from the west. All of them were introduced weekly in a series of Guest Reveals presented on Cosplay Mania's Facebook page.

The Meet and Greet Premium Pass were available to KANAME☆, Reika, Inui Tatsumi and Vampy, now with two sessions available for KANAME☆ and Reika.  Inui Tatsumi will be partnered with Orochi X to share one session together, while Vampy's two sessions will be accompanied with Jesuke and Pinky respectively.

Cosplay Mania JAM Concert

As part of the evolution theme, the event introduced JAM (Japanese Anime Music), a two-day concert held at Function Room 5 which starts at 7pm.  The concert featured Japanese singer Aya Ikeda, who sang songs from the anime Pretty Cure, and Loverin Tamburin, a band that covers a variety of anime songs but best known for "Aishitageru" (愛したげる), the opening song for the anime Makai Senki Disgaea. The concert will also be accompanied by local anime cover band Moonspeak and Ninja Tuna.  Japanese cosplayers KANAME☆ and Reika will be having collaborative singing performance with Moonspeak. This would be KANAME☆'s first ever singing performance in a convention.

Aya Ikeda also had her own Meet and Greet session prior to the concert, but also held her own handshake and merchandise selling session after her performance on Cosplay Mania JAM Day 2. Loverin Tamburin also initiated their own Meet and Greet but free of charge, giving away free posters for signing as well as the selling of their music CD's.

Ticketing System

Cosplay Mania improved on their ticketing system by providing more options for con-goers on how they will customize their convention experience by introducing the following ticket tier system:

 Bronze ticket Php 150 - provides access only at the Dealer Hall at Function Room 4 per day.
 Silver ticket Php 250 - provides access to both Dealer Hall (FR4) and Stage Hall (FR5) per day.
 Gold ticket Php 400 - provides access to the Dealer Hall (FR4), Stage Hall and JAM Concert (FR5) per day.
 Platinum ticket Php 700 - provides access for only one single Meet and Greet session with the available guest of their choice.
 Titanium ticket Php 5,000 - a very limited (10 tickets available for sale) ALL ACCESS ticket which includes the following perks:   
  • Valid for 2-days;
  • Access to ANY Meet-and-Greet of the user's choice;
  • Limitless access to the Dealers Hall and Main Stage;
  • A VIP seat inside the Main Stage;
  • Access to the Cosplay Mania JAM Concert;
  • A VIP seat during the Cosplay Mania JAM Concert;
  • Limited Edition Poster signed by all of the guests;
  • Gift packs from partners

The Titanium tickets have long been sold out since August of this year.  However one ticket will be given away at Cosplay Mania's Early Bird Raffle.

All tickets are available for purchase at all SM Tickets outlets.

Notable supporters of the event include Japan's Haneda Music Festival, Magic: The Gathering, Doraemon and even the appearance of the official Pikachu mascot which was recently named by Japan as the official mascot for the 2014 Brazil FIFA World Cup.

2015
This year's Cosplay Mania has increased their floor space to include Function Rooms 2 to 5, and Meeting Rooms 2 to 9, occupying over 7,000 sq/m. The layout has also been reversed, with the Exhibitor Hall occupying Function Rooms 4 and 5, and the stage area occupying 2 and 3. As a result, the Exhibitor Room, dubbed as Hall Ex, has over 200 exhibitor booths ranging from game booths to assorted merchandise. The stage are, dubbed Hall S, was smaller in size than last year, but has enough space in allowing audiences to comfortably enjoy the cosplay competition and the JAM concert. The meeting rooms are still assigned for Meet and Greet activities and merchandise selling.

Cosplay Mania Roadshow

Months prior to Cosplay Mania, Cosplay.ph had intensified their promotion by creating events and partnering with other organizations, both in cosplay and Japanese concerts. Most notable are Cosplay Carnival, NexCon, TORCH series, Meet and Greet Madness and the LISA mini-concert held at SMX Aura.

Cosplay Mania Cup

The Cosplay Mania Roadshow created a series of Individual category cosplay contests in each of their events that would culminate in the final showdown during Cosplay Mania.  The winner receives the Championship prize.  This is separate from the Cosplay Mania's own Cosplay Solo Showdown, also an individual category cosplay contest.

Tournament of Champions (TORCH)

The activity has been delegated as part of the Cosplay Mania Roadshow event, and finalists from 8 cities have participated at the grand finals at Cosplay Mania.  The winner of this year's TORCH was Team Ban x Kai, a team known to have joined TORCH continuously since 2010. They will represent the Philippines at Anime Festival Asia's Regional Cosplay Contest in Singapore.

Cosplay Mania '15 Guests

Ten guests graced event, with cosplayer celebrities KANAME☆ from Japan, Ying Tze from Malaysia, Jesuke Jes from Singapore and Hana and Baozi from China, and JAM performers Itsuki Akira, Ladybeard, Loverin Tamburin, Aya Ikeda and Pile (singer).

Ticketing System

Cosplay Mania maintained last year's tier system but with an increase of their prices. All tickets, except for Platinum and Titanium, can be upgraded:

 Bronze ticket Php 198 - provides access only at Hall Ex per day.
 Silver ticket Php 298 - provides access to both Hall Ex and Hall S per day.
 Gold ticket Php 498 - provides access to Hall Ex, Hall S and JAM Concert per day.
 Platinum (Meet and Greet) ticket Php 700 - provides access for only one single Meet and Greet session with the available guest of their choice. The Jpop singer Pile, however, had her own ticket price of Php 2,500.
 Titanium ticket Php 5,000 - a very limited (20 tickets available for sale) ALL ACCESS ticket which includes the following perks:

All tickets are available for purchase at all SM Tickets outlets.

Notable activities

Cosplay.ph has partnered with NHK with a Japanese Karaoke contest called Asia Karaoke Nodojiman, whose winner was announced the same day and won a free trip and accommodations to Japan.

Notable partners

This year the event has partnered with Daiichi Kosho, Japan International Broadcasting Inc. and Daisuki.net.

2016

Cosplay.ph, the organization behind Cosplay Mania, has announced the date of next year's event as October 1 and 2, 2016 at SMX Convention Center beside SM Mall of Asia.

It occupied the whole function rooms 1-5 and features more interactive games. Guests artists, voice actors and cosplayers from Asia are also invited.

2018

The decade-old convention returns to SMX Convention Center, September 29 & 30, 2018.

In their 10th year, the convention featured big names as special guests:

 AiRI
 Megumi Nakajima
 fhána (band) 
 Zwei
 Hiroki Ino 
 Kousuke Asuma 
 Chiharu Sawashiro
 Shunsuke Takeuchi

2019

2020-2021 
cosplay mania was never held due to the COVID-19 pandemic.

2022
After two years of hiatus due to the pandemic, Cosplay Mania is back in SMX Convention Center, October 1–2.

Guests include voice actor Nozomu Sasaki, the VTuber group Yashin Live, Hololive Indonesia VTuber Kureiji Ollie, among others. The Philippine branch of Bilibili is touted as among the sponsors for the year's event.

References

External links
Cosplay Mania Official Website
Cosplay.ph - Philippine Cosplay Compedium

2008 establishments in the Philippines
Anime conventions in the Philippines
Annual events in the Philippines
Events in Metro Manila
Recurring events established in 2008